Alia Tempora is a Czech electronic metal/symphonic metal band from the city of Brno. Their music is influenced by pop, dance, and dubstep music. The band is characterized by their catchy tunes, captivating shows, and fan-friendly attitude. The band has toured widely both nationally and overseas, including playing concerts across Europe and South America. Lead vocalist Markie Morávková is the daughter of Miloš Morávek, guitarist of the bands Progres 2, Futurum, Kern, and Synkopy.

History
Alia Tempora was formed by Markie Morávková and Štěpán Řezníček in 2012 in Brno. Their first single, "Frozen", was released in 2013 and in November 2015, the band issued their debut album, titled Digital Cube, featuring Dutch guitarist Timo Somers, formerly of the symphonic metal band Delain. The album was supported by a successful crowdfunding campaign as well as by the city of Brno. Gustavo Sazes, famous for designing album covers for bands such as Amaranthe and Arch Enemy, created the artwork for Digital Cube. The song "Mockingjay" was inspired by the movie Hunger Games. In 2018, Alia Tempora supported Swedish act Amaranthe on their Baltic tour in Latvia, Lithuania, and Estonia. The most common touring destination for Alia Tempora is the United Kingdom and Western Europe.

The group released their second album, Dragonfly Effect, on 21 September 2019 and introduced it at the Masters of Rock 2019 Ronnie James Dio Stage. They followed this with an extensive tour of Europe and Mexico. The album again includes a collaboration with Timo Somers.

Band members
Current
 Markéta Morávková – clean vocals
 Štěpán Řezníček – guitar, growling vocals
 Roman Škrabal – bass
 Marek Brázdil – drums
 Filip Hrazdira – songwriting, production, graphic design

Past
 Aleš Winkler – drums
 Vojta Vozáb
 Radek Žák – guitar
 Pavel Žák – bass
 Patrik Macháček – drums

Discography
 Digital Cube (2015)
 Dragonfly Effect (2019)

References

External links

 

Czech heavy metal musical groups
Musical groups established in 2012